Trova is a traditional form of poem in four verses, composed by seven syllables, common in Brazil and Portugal, being a staple of popular literature.
According to the poet Luiz Otávio, a "trova" isː

Fernando Pessoa considers "trova is the flower vase that people puts in the window of their soul."

Example of trova by Luiz Otávio:

Structure
Trova is a poem composed by four verses, each containing seven syllables, without a title, self-enclosed in its own verses. The Trova are usually related to popular culture, and figured heavily on the popularization of literature in Brazil, being recognized as a popular art form, and is subject to several contests in Brazil.

History
Although the Trova is currently a lusophone form of literature, it has its origins in the Medieval Era, where it was used to refer to any form of popular music or verse. From the south of France, the Trova expanded, reaching Portugal, and, eventually, Brazil, where it became a popular form of poetry.

References 

 CAMPOS, GEIR. Pequeno dicionário de arte poética. Rio de Janeiro: Edições de Ouro, 1960.
 Dicionário Houaiss da Língua Portuguesa

External links 
 Falando de trova (in portuguese)
 Poesia em trovas (in portuguese)

Stanzaic form
Poetic forms

pt:Trova